Belgin Doruk (28 June 1936 – 26 March 1995) was a popular Turkish film actress.

Biography
Belgin Doruk was born in Ankara, Turkey in 1936. While she continued her education in a high school she took part in a competition and became first along with Ayhan Işık and Mahir Özerdem. Having won the competition she started her film career that would last more than 20 years. She died of heart failure in Istanbul in 1995.

Filmography

 1952 - Yavuz Sultan Selim Ağlıyor
 1952 - Kanlı Çiftlik
 1952 - Çakırcalı Mehmet Efe'nin Definesi
 1953 - Köroğlu
 1953 - Öldüren sehir ~ Selma
 1955 - Son Beste
 1955 - Ölüm Korkusu
 1955 - Kader
 1957 - Lejyon Dönüşü
 1957 - Mahşere Kadar
 1957 - Çölde Bir İstanbul Kızı
 1957 - Çileli Bülbül
 1958 - Kederli Yıllar
 1958 - Daha Çekecek Miyim?
 1958 - Beraber Ölelim
 1958 - Hayat Cehennemi
 1959 - Ölmeyen Aşk
 1959 - Kırık Plak
 1959 - Binnaz Binnaz
 1959 - Annemi Arıyorum
 1959 - Samanyolu
 1959 - Ömrümün Tek Gecesi
 1960 - Kanlı Firar
 1960 - Yeşil Köşkün Lambası 1960
 1960 - İlk Aşk 1960
 1960 - Bir Yaz Yağmuru 1960
 1960 - Ayşecik Şeytan Çekici 1960
 1960 - Satın Alınan Adam 1960
 1960 - Gece Kuşu 1960
 1960 - Aslan Yavrusu 1960
 1961 - Zavallı Necdet
 1961 - Özleyiş
 1961 - Düğün Alayı
 1961 - Bülbül Yuvası
 1961 - Bir Yaz Yağmuru
 1961 - Bir Demet Yasemen
 1961 - Aşkın Saati Gelince
 1961 - Tatlı Günah
 1961 - Küçük Hanımefendi
 1961 - Kızıl Vazo
 1962 - Küçük Hanım Avrupa'da
 1962 - Gönül Avcısı
 1962 - Daima Kalbimdesin
 1962 - Küçük Hanımın Şoförü
 1962 - Yalnızlar İçin
 1962 - Aşka Karşı Gelinmez
 1962 - Küçük Hanımın Kısmeti
 1962 - Hayat Bazen Tatlıdır
 1963 - Kadınlar Hep Aynıdır
 1963 - İlk Göz Ağrısı
 1963 - Aşk Tomurcukları
 1963 - Akdeniz Şarkısı
 1963 - Acı Aşk
 1963 - Kahpe
 1963 - Bahçevan
 1964 - Şoförler Kralı
 1964 - Bitirimsin Hanım Abla
 1964 - Duvarların Ötesi
 1964 - Aşk ve Kin
 1964 - Suçlular Aramızda
 1964 - İstanbul Kaldırımları
 1964 - Evcilik Oyunu
 1965 - Satılık Kalp
 1965 - Yasak Cennet
 1965 - Güzel Bir Gün İçin
 1965 - Kırık Hayatlar Vadide
 1965 - Sayılı Dakikalar
 1965 - Hep O Şarkı
 1965 - Bir Gönül Oyunu
 1965 - Şoförün Kızı
 1965 - Bozuk Düzen
 1966 - Sevgilim Bir Artistti
 1966 - Allahaısmarladık Yavrum / Yarın Ağlayacağım
 1966 - Allahaısmarladık
 1966 - Toprağın Kanı
 1967 - Yıkılan Gurur
 1968 - Atlı Karınca Dönüyor
 1968 - Kanlı Nigâr Kanlı Nigâr
 1968 - İstanbul'u Sevmiyorum
 1969 - Ayşecik Yuvanın Bekçileri
 1969 - Şahane İntikam
 1970 - Küçük Hanımın Şoförü
 1970 - Gönül Meyhanesi
 1970 - Pamuk Prenses Ve 7 Cüceler Ana Kraliçe
 1972 - Gecekondu Rüzgârı

References
 
 Biography of Belgin Doruk 
 Biography of Belgin Doruk

External links
 Yeşilçam Street Online - Belgin Doruk

1936 births
1995 deaths
20th-century Turkish actresses
Actresses from Ankara
Best Actress Golden Orange Award winners
Burials at Zincirlikuyu Cemetery
Turkish film actresses